Liborius of Le Mans (c. 348–397) was the second Bishop of Le Mans.

Liborius may also refer to:

People
Liborius Ndumbukuti Nashenda (born 1959), Namibian Roman Catholic archbishop
Liborius Ritter von Frank (1848 — 1935) Austro-Hungarian military leader

Other
St. Liborius School, private elementary school in Illinois

See also
Libor (disambiguation)